Alexander Mohr (1892–1974) was a German Expressionist artist.

Life and work

Mohr was born in Frankenberg, Germany, to affluent parents who hailed from an aristocratic background. Mohr commenced his formal artistic instruction in 1905 in Koblenz, Germany under the tutelage of German expressionist William Straube (1871–1954), who was a student of Henri Matisse.  His formal training was interrupted by World War I where he served as a Cavalry Officer from 1914 to 1918 in the war's eastern front.

The war behind him, in 1919 Mohr studied under expressionist Adolf Holzel (1853–1934) in Stuttgart and executed his works in the circle of the Rhenish Expressionists in Düsseldorf.

In 1919, he illustrated a book for famed German expressionist writer Carl Maria Weber and later rendered avant-garde illustrations for other publications. Commencing in 1920 Mohr began a lifelong friendship with the French-German writer Joseph Breitbach (1903–1980).

In 1922, Mohr participated in the First International Art Exhibition in Düsseldorf.  Later that year Mohr transitioned to Berlin where he became a member of the expressionist November Group and developed an acquaintance with art-handlers Alfred Flechtheim and Wilhelm Uhde.

From 1925 to 1931, Mohr both studied and worked in Paris with three one-man exhibitions in 1927, 1929 and 1930. Through his acquaintance with expressionist Max Jacob, Mohr gained access to Pablo Picasso, with further references from his author friend Joseph Breitbach. While in Paris, Mohr was comfortable and frequently seen with the bon vivant literary elite of Paris, including Jean Schlumberger, André Gide and Julien Green.

Many believe that Mohr's finest expressionist paintings were executed during his Paris years and represented bucolic, mythological scenes influenced by the writings of Virgil, Horace and Ovid as the three canonical poets of Latin literature.

On occasion during 1925 to 1930 Mohr journeyed to Hungary, Spain, Italy and Switzerland to advance his expressionist agenda. In Rhenish Expressionism1932, Mohr visited Greece where he met and married Elsa Kahn, who would remain his lifelong partner. (Elsa's uncle was investment banker Otto Kahn (1867–1934) who built a 127-room mansion on Long Island, the second largest private residence in the United States, after George Vanderbilt's Biltmore Estate in Asheville, North Carolina.)

For the next decade, Mohr worked mostly in Germany, favoring his family homes in Trier and also Merzig, but also with frequent stays in Paris and Greece, inclusive of exhibitions in both Germany and Greece.  His last one-man exhibition in Paris was in 1939 as the rumblings of World War II became louder. Mohr recognized the signs of conflict and opted to reside in Greece from 1942 to 1949.

From the mid-1930s, Mohr's artistic style migrated from expressionism to a more abstract form of the German expressionist movement, albeit some characterize this period as a transition to cubism by Mohr. While both expressionism and cubism are forms of modern art, cubism is based much less on the expression of emotion than it is on an intellectual experiment with structure and few would argue that emotion is lacking in Mohr's works. His paintings exude expressive emotion and are executed with quintessential German exactitude.  Mohr was a wizard in catching an expression as elusive as thought. A master of expressionist painting, Mohr latched on to the brash and angular. We can only imagine Mohr propped on his studio stool, well-groomed yet smug as he lays evanescent highlights onto the implastic background of the canvas of his early expressionistic work and on another occasion wondering if we will identify the blended nuances, all but hidden, in his later abstract expressionist works.

From 1950 to 1953, Mohr once again migrated to Paris and worked from a studio provided by the Schlumberger family and remained in close contact with his friend Joseph Breitbach.

Beginning in the mid-1950s, Mohr resumed his peripatetic travel rhythm and his lifelong expressionist painting passion became a more casual endeavor. On February 8, 1974, expressionist painter Alexander Mohr died after a short illness in Athens, Greece and was interred there.

Several retrospective exhibitions of the work of Alexander Mohr were held in the following decades. His life is described in Alexander Mohr–Der Maler mit den Flügelschuhen a 410-page illustrated monograph written by Christl Lehnert-Leven and published in 1996 in Germany.

Exhibitions

1919  Cologne, Cologne Art Association, Society of the Kunste, November
1922  Düsseldorf, Leonhard Tietz AG, First International Art Exhibition, 28 May to 3 July
1922  Berlin, Gallerie Alfred Flechtheim, One-man exhibition, October
1924  Trier, Artist's home, Christmas exhibition, December
1927  Paris, Galerie Zborowski, One-man exhibition, 7 to 22 January
1927  Trier, Paulusplatz, College exhibition, April
1928  Essen, Folkwang Museum Exhibition, January
1928  Düsseldorf, Kunstpalast, German art exhibition, May to October
1929  Paris, Galerie aux Quatre Chemins, One-man exhibition, 16 to 30 November
1930  Paris, Galerie Klienmann & Cie., One-man exhibition, 31 October to 14 November
1930  Trier, Kornmarkt, Annual exhibition, 30 November to 14 December
1931  Trier, Bezirk, Annual exhibition, 6 to 20 December
1931-1932  Athens, Galerie Parnassos, One-man exhibition, 20 December to 4 January
1932  Luxembourg, Galerie Menn, One-man exhibition, 16 April to 4 May
1932  Trier, Bischof-Korum house, Rhenish exhibition, 18 to 20 June
1932  Trier, Kornmarkt, Annual exhibition, December
1932-1933  Athens, Galerie Studio, One-man exhibition, 18 December to 18 January
1933  Cologne, Cologne Art Association, One-man exhibition, 1 to 26 December
1934  Stuttgart, Wurttembergischer Art Association, One-man exhibition, 6 January to 4 February
1934  Athens, Galerie D’Art Geo, One-man exhibition, 19 November to 15 December
1935  Cologne, Cologne Art Association, One-man exhibition, September
1935  Saarbrücken, National Museum, One-man exhibition, 20 October to 20 November
1936  Trier, Paulusplatz, Exhibition, August to September
1938  Athens, Galerie Stratigopoulos, One-man exhibition, 2 to 19 February
1939  Paris, Galerie Poyet, One-man exhibition, 17 March to 5 April
1939  Trier, Konstantinplatz, Christmas exhibition, 15 November to 16 December
1941  Berlin, Kunstdienst Exhibition, 28 September to 26 October
1941  Trier, Konstantinplatz, Christmas exhibition, December
1942  Posen, Kaiser Friedrich Museum, Exhibition, 21 March to 19 April
1942  Breslau, Station der Vorgen, Exhibition, 21 June to 19 July
1942  Trier, Palastmuseum, Exhibition, July
1942  Luxembourg, Kunsthaus, Exhibition, December
1943  Luxembourg, Kunsthaus Exhibition, 17 October to 19 December
1944  Trier, Palastmuseum Exhibition, July
1944  Luxembourg, Fruhjahrsausstellung, Exhibition, March
1946  Trier, Paulusplatz, Exhibition, 22 September to 12 October
1947  Trier, Paulusplatz, Christmas exhibition, December
1950  Mettlach, Abteigebaude, One-man exhibition, 7 to 21 May
1954  Saarlouis, French Consulate, One-man exhibition, July and August
1958  Athens, Goethe Institute, One-man exhibition, 27 March to 9 April
1958  Saarbrücken, Galerie van Hees, One-man exhibition, 23 October to 7 November
1961  Wurgendorf, Heimhoftheater, One-man exhibition, 11 to 23 November
1961  Koblenz, Kurfurstliches  Schloss, One-man exhibition, 10 to 23 December
1962  Marseille, Goethe Institute, One-man exhibition, 5 to 17 February
1962  Bonn, Bucherstube, One-man exhibition, 9 to 29 March
1962  Krefeld, Galerie Carl Uhrig, One-man exhibition, April
1962  Nauheim, Kurhaus, Exhibition, May
1962  Giessen, Universitatsbibliothek, One-man exhibition, 23 June to 11 July
1962  Wetzlar, Exhibition Hall, One-man exhibition, July and August
1962  Bad Ems, Kursaalgebaude, One-man exhibition, 1 to 14 September
1962  Koblenz, Kurfurstliches Schloss, Exhibition, 22 September to 22 October
1962  Frankfurt, Dornbuschaus, One-man exhibition, 3 to 22 November
1964  Düsseldorf, Verein-Malkasten, One-man exhibition, 17 March to 8 April
1966  Ploermel, Galerie les Marmousets, One-man exhibition, 3 to 31 December
1976  Trier, Stadtisches Museum Simeonstift, Exhibition, 12 March to 19 April
1977  Merzig, Hilbringen, Exhibition, 18 to 22 February
1993  Bonn, August Macke House, Rhenish expressionism exhibition, 28 February to 2 May
1996  Trier, Stadtisches Museum Simeonstift, Exhibition, 29 April to 1 September
1996-1997  Trier, Stadtisches Museum Simeonstift, Retrospective, 16 December to 31 March
1997  Koblenz, Mittelrhein-Museum, Retrospective, 30 April to 1 June
1999-2000  Newport Beach, The Pacific Art Foundation, Retrospective, 15 November to 15 May

References
Bibliography of the History of Art: BHA = Bibliographie D'histoire de L'art Published by Centre national de la recherche scientifique, Institut de l'information scientifique et technique, 1998
Weisenfeld, G.S. Mavo: Japanese Artists and the Avant-garde, 1905-1931 (University of California Press, 2002)
Christl Lehnert-Leven Alexander Mohr: Der Maler mit den Flügelschuhen (Selbstverlag des Stadtischen Museums: Germany, 1996)

Greek artists
German Expressionist painters
20th-century German painters
20th-century German male artists
German male painters
1892 births
1974 deaths
Modern painters